The Aeros UL-2000 Flamingo is a Czech ultralight aircraft, designed produced by Aeros SRO (CZ) of Kutná Hora. It was introduced at the Aero show held in Friedrichshafen in 2001.

Design and development
The aircraft was designed to comply with the Fédération Aéronautique Internationale microlight rules. It features a cantilever high-wing, a two-seats-in-side-by-side configuration enclosed cockpit, tricycle landing gear and a single engine in tractor configuration.

Its  span wing employs flaps. The controls are conventional, with push-rod controlled elevators, rudder and flaps. Standard engines available are the  Rotax 912ULS or Verner 1400S four-stroke engines and the  Hirth F30 and the  Hirth 2706 two-stroke powerplants.

Specifications (Flamingo)

References

2000s Czech ultralight aircraft
Homebuilt aircraft
Single-engined tractor aircraft